Washington School was a historic school building located at Logansport, Cass County, Indiana. It was built in 1899, and was a two-story, square, Richardsonian Romanesque style building of yellow brick with limestone trim.  It featured a round arch entrance, projecting bays, and a limestone portico supported by paired Ionic order columns on the second story. A gymnasium addition was erected in the late-1950s.

It was listed on the National Register of Historic Places in 1981 and delisted in 1985.

References

Former National Register of Historic Places in Indiana
School buildings on the National Register of Historic Places in Indiana
Richardsonian Romanesque architecture in Indiana
School buildings completed in 1899
Schools in Cass County, Indiana
National Register of Historic Places in Cass County, Indiana
1899 establishments in Indiana